Arcturus Therapeutics is an American RNA medicines biotechnology company focused on the discovery, development and commercialization of therapeutics for rare diseases and infectious diseases. Arcturus has developed a novel, potent, and safe RNA therapeutics platform called Lunar, a proprietary lipid-enabled delivery system for nucleic acid medicines including small interfering RNA (siRNA), messenger RNA (mRNA), gene editing RNA, DNA, antisense oligonucleotides (ASO), and microRNA.

The company's pipeline includes RNA therapeutics for the treatment of rare diseases such as ornithine transcarbamylase deficiency,and respiratory diseases such as cystic fibrosis. Vaccine medicines include a vaccine candidate for COVID-19 and an influenza vaccine in the preclinical development phase.

Company history
Founded in 2013 by Joseph Payne and Dr. Pad Chivukula, Arcturus Therapeutics is headquartered in San Diego, California, USA. The company's core technology platform is a proprietary lipid nanoparticle-mediated delivery system able to deliver therapeutic RNA or DNA to target cells inside a patient's body. The company has a portfolio of eight mRNA-based therapeutics and two mRNA-based vaccines in development.

In September 2017, Arcturus Therapeutics merged with Alcobra Ltd., an Israeli pharmaceutical company. In February of 2018, Joseph Payne was dismissed as president and CEO by the Arcturus Therapeutics board of directors at that time. In the aftermath, as the largest shareholder, Joseph Payne filed formal requests to hold a meeting of shareholders for the purpose of selecting new members to the Arcturus Therapeutics board of directors. Under applicable law, Arcturus’ board must have honored Mr. Payne’s request by establishing a meeting date and convening said meeting within a clearly defined timeframe. Rather than adhering to the law, the Board ignored the applicable deadlines and opted to postpone the shareholder meeting indefinitely.  Joseph Payne subsequently filed legal proceedings with the Israeli Court which ruled in favor of upholding shareholder rights by sanctioning the meeting of shareholders. In April of 2018, the Arcturus Therapeutics board of directors at the time filed their own complaint against Joseph Payne and his nominees to the board. In May of 2018, a legal settlement was agreed upon: 4 new directors were appointed to the board (Dr. Peter Farrell, Mr. Andrew Sassine, Mr. James Barlow and Dr. Magda Marquet) resulting in the resignation of Dr. Stuart Collinson, Mr. Daniel Geffken, Dr. David Shapiro, and Mr. Craig Willett. Other key terms of the settlement agreement included mutual releases of all parties and the agreement by Arcturus Therapeutics and Joseph Payne to terminate all pending litigation. 

On June 27, 2019, the FDA granted Orphan Drug Designation for the company's lead product candidate ARCT-810 to treat an inherited metabolic disorder, ornithine transcarbamylase deficiency (OTCD). OTCD is the most common urea cycle disorder, which impacts an individual's ability to remove toxic waste products from the body. The orphan drug designation is granted to drugs capable of treating rare diseases that affect less than 200,000 people in the United States. Drug products approved by the FDA that have orphan drug status receive up to 7 years of marketing exclusivity. On April 13, 2020, it was announced that the company's investigational new drug (IND) application for Phase 1b study in patients with OTCD was allowed to proceed by the U.S. FDA. A Clinical Trial Application (CTA) for a Phase 1 study in healthy volunteers was approved by the New Zealand Medicines and Medical Devices Safety Authority (Medsafe). On June 5, 2020 Arcturus Therapeutics announced it dosed its first healthy volunteer in a Phase 1 study with ARCT-810. Following the success of Phase 1a, clinical phase progression continued in December 2020 with the dosing of the first patients in phase 1b of the Clinical Trial.

Platform 
Lunar

Arcturus Therapeutics' primary technology platform for RNA therapeutics is called Lunar  a novel lipid-mediated delivery system. Lunar is a multi-component drug delivery system that enables scientists to target specific cells inside the body and deliver a payload of RNA into the cell. Once release of the RNA into the cell occurs, the normal translational machinery of the cell can interact with the RNA to make a functional protein with a therapeutic effect.

ARCT-810, the company's lead product utilizes Arcturus' Lunar lipid-mediated delivery platform intended to safely and effectively deliver OTC messenger RNA to liver cells. Lunar mediated delivery to the liver has been confirmed in collaboration with the Salk Institute for Biological Studies in La Jolla, California which demonstrated the successful Lunar-mediated delivery of a Factor IX messenger RNA (FIX mRNA) to the liver as reported in a publication in PNAS, where it was confirmed be efficacious. Lunar is an effective and reproducible LNP mRNA delivery platform to potentially treat diseases requiring protein replacement. Researchers at the MD Anderson Cancer Center also showed the unique application of microRNAs delivered in nanoparticles using the Lunar platform as novel immune therapeutics for the treatment of malignancy.

Starr

Starr technology is a combination of self-replicating mRNA with the Lunar delivery platform which increases the level and duration of expression of a therapeutic protein. The Starr technology platform is able to generate a protective immune response against infectious pathogens or increase the expression of therapeutic proteins to prevent and treat a variety of diseases. Arcturus is using the Starr technology to develop vaccines for both COVID-19 and, separately, influenza.

Products in development

Lunar-COV19

ARCT-021 

In response to the COVID-19 pandemic, the form partnered with Duke–NUS Medical School to develop a COVID-19 vaccine using Starr technology (Starr technology is a combination of self-replicating mRNA with the Lunar delivery platform which increases the level and duration of expression of a therapeutic protein). The company also partnered with Catalent and Recipharm, contract development and manufacturing organizations, to manufacture multiple batches of Arcturus' COVID-19 mRNA vaccine candidate. Lunar-COV19 clinical trials in healthy volunteers began in July 2020. Phase 2 clinical trials were approved in the United States and Singapore by the FDA and HSA, respectively in December 2020.

Next-generations 

On 2 August 2021, ARCT-154 started a clinical trial in Vietnam for next-generation development. The next day, the firm announced that the application of approval for the clinical trial Phase I/II in Singapore called ARCT-165. Also application of ARCT-154 for phase I/II.

Lunar-OTC 
A wholly owned mRNA medicine to treat ornithine transcarbamylase deficiency, a life-threatening genetic disease caused by lack of the  enzyme in liver cells; there is currently no cure . In 2019, Lunar-OTC received FDA orphan drug status. Lunar OTC clinical trials in patients began June 2020. In December 2020, clinical phase 1b of Lunar-OTC began with dosing in patients.

Other projects

Lunar-CF is a project in collaboration with the Cystic Fibrosis Foundation to treat cystic fibrosis.

Lunar-FLU is a  wholly owned program to protect against the influenza virus. Arcturus is combining its self-replicating mRNA Starr technology with Lunar to develop a prophylactic vaccine against influenza.

Lunar-GSD is a project in collaboration with Ultragenyx to treat glycogen storage disease type III.

Lunar-Rare is a project in collaboration with Ultragenyx to develop therapeutic candidates for rare disease targets.

Lunar-HBV is a project in collaboration with Janssen to develop medicines for the treatment of hepatitis B virus infection.

Lunar-NASH is a project in collaboration with Takeda to develop medicines for non-alcoholic steatohepatitis (NASH) and other gastrointestinal disorders.

Lunar-RPL is a project in collaboration with Synthetic Genomics to develop improved technology for vaccines and therapeutics.

Lunar-AH is a project in collaboration with Synthetic Genomics to develop infectious disease prophylactic vaccines.

References

External links 
 Business Data for Arcturus Therapeutics: Yahoo Finance   Reuters   Bloomberg   Nasdaq   SEC Filings

Companies listed on the Nasdaq
Biotechnology companies of the United States
COVID-19 vaccine producers
American companies established in 2013